Edward Olivares Balzac (November 5, 1938 – October 14, 2022) was a Major League Baseball outfielder and third baseman who spent parts of two seasons playing for the St. Louis Cardinals. Olivares' full professional baseball career extended for nine years (1957–1961; 1963–1966).

Career
Olivares was originally signed by the Philadelphia Phillies before the  season. In his two trials for the MLB Redbirds, he got into 24 games with 11 starts. But he managed only five hits, all singles, in 35 at bats (with no bases on balls), for a batting average of .143.

Following the  season, Olivares was drafted by the Houston Colt .45s with the 33rd overall selection in the 1961 expansion draft, but never appeared in another major league game.

His son, Omar, was an MLB pitcher for 12 seasons. Ed Olivares died on October 14, 2022, at the age of 83.

See also
 List of Major League Baseball players from Puerto Rico

References

External links

1938 births
2022 deaths
Atlanta Crackers players
Charlotte Hornets (baseball) players
Daytona Beach Islanders players
Major League Baseball left fielders
Major League Baseball players from Puerto Rico
Major League Baseball right fielders
Major League Baseball third basemen
Memphis Chickasaws players
Montgomery Rebels players
People from Mayagüez, Puerto Rico
Pittsburgh Pirates scouts
American expatriate baseball players in Canada
Rochester Red Wings players
St. Louis Cardinals players
San Antonio Bullets players
Tampa Tarpons (1957–1987) players
Tulsa Oilers (baseball) players
Winnipeg Goldeyes players
Winston-Salem Red Birds players
Sportspeople from Brooklyn
Baseball players from New York City